Twelve national teams competed in the women's Olympic field hockey tournament at the 2004 Summer Olympics in Athens. Sixteen players were officially enrolled in each squad.

Pool A

The following is the Argentine roster in the women's field hockey tournament of the 2004 Summer Olympics.

Head coach: Sergio Vigil

Mariela Antoniska (GK)
Magdalena Aicega (c)
Marina di Giacomo
Ayelén Stepnik
Alejandra Gulla
Luciana Aymar
Vanina Oneto
Soledad García
Mariana González Oliva
Mercedes Margalot
María de la Paz Hernández
Cecilia Rognoni
Paola Vukojicic (GK)
Mariné Russo
Inés Arrondo
Claudia Burkart

The following is the Chinese roster in the women's field hockey tournament of the 2004 Summer Olympics.

Head coach: Kim Chang-back

Nie Yali (GK)
Chen Zhaoxia (C)
Ma Yibo
Cheng Hui
Mai Shaoyan
Huang Junxia
Fu Baorong
Li Shuang
Gao Lihua
Tang Chunling
Zhou Wanfeng
Hou Xiaolan
Zhang Yimeng (GK)
Qiu Yingling
Chen Qiuqi
Chen Qunqing

The following is the Japanese roster in the women's field hockey tournament of the 2004 Summer Olympics.

Head coach: Kazunori Kobayashi

Rie Terazono (GK)
Keiko Miura (C)
Akemi Kato
Yukari Yamamoto
Sachimi Iwao
Chie Kimura
Rika Komazawa
Sakae Morimoto
Kaori Chiba
Naoko Saito
Tomomi Komori
Nami Miyazaki (GK)
Akiko Kitada
Rika Ishida
Emi Sakurai
Miyuki Nakagawa

The following is the New Zealand roster in the women's field hockey tournament of the 2004 Summer Olympics.

Head coach: Ian Rutledge

Kayla Sharland
Emily Naylor
Rachel Sutherland
Meredith Orr
Jaimee Provan
Leisen Jobe
Lizzy Igasan
Stacey Carr
Lisa Walton
Suzie Muirhead (C)
Beth Jurgeleit (GK)
Helen Clarke (GK)
Diana Weavers
Niniwa Roberts
Rachel Robertson
Tara Drysdale

The following is the Spanish roster in the women's field hockey tournament of the 2004 Summer Olympics.

Head coach: Pablo Usoz

María Jesús Rosa (GK)
Rocío Ybarra
Bárbara Malda
Mónica Rueda
Silvia Bonastre
María del Carmen Martín
Marta Prat
Silvia Muñoz
Lucía López
María del Mar Feito
Maider Tellería
Erdoitza Goikoetxea
Núria Camón
Ana Pérez
Maider Luengo
Esther Termens

Pool B

The following is the Australian roster in the women's field hockey tournament of the 2004 Summer Olympics.

Head coach: David Bell

Toni Cronk (GK)
Louise Dobson
Karen Smith
Peta Gallagher
Bianca Netzler
Emily Halliday
Nicole Arrold
Rachel Imison (GK)
Carmel Bakurski
Katie Allen
Angie Skirving
Melanie Twitt
Suzie Faulkner
Julie Towers
Katrina Powell (C)
Nikki Hudson

The following is the German roster in the women's field hockey tournament of the 2004 Summer Olympics.

Head coach: Markus Weise

Tina Bachmann
Denise Klecker
Mandy Haase
Nadine Ernsting-Krienke
Caroline Casaretto
Natascha Keller
Silke Müller
Marion Rodewald (C)
Heike Lätzsch
Fanny Rinne
Louisa Walter (GK)
Anke Kühn
Badri Latif
<li value=23>Julia Zwehl (GK)
<li value=27>Sonja Lehmann
<li value=32>Franziska Gude

{{fhw|NED}}
The following is the Dutch roster in the women's field hockey tournament of the 2004 Summer Olympics.

Head coach: Marc Lammers

Clarinda Sinnige (GK)
Lisanne de Roever (GK)
Macha van der Vaart
Fatima Moreira de Melo
Jiske Snoeks
Maartje Scheepstra
Miek van Geenhuizen
<li value=9>Sylvia Karres
<li value=10>Mijntje Donners (C)
Ageeth Boomgaardt
<li value=13>Minke Smeets
Minke Booij
Janneke Schopman
Chantal de Bruijn
Eefke Mulder
<li value=21>Lieve van Kessel

{{fhw|RSA}}
The following is the South African roster in the women's field hockey tournament of the 2004 Summer Olympics.

Head coach: Ros Howell

Caroline Birt (GK)
<li value=3>Kate Hector
<li value=6>Anli Kotze
Natalie Fulton
Marsha Marescia
<li value=10>Johke Koornhof
<li value=12>Lindsey Carlisle
<li value=14>Kerry Bee
<li value=15>Pietie Coetzee
Jenny Wilson
<li value=24>Fiona Butler
Liesel Dorothy
<li value=28>Tsoanelo Pholo
<li value=30>Sharne Wehmeyer
Susan Webber (C)
Grazjyna Engelbrecht (GK)

{{fhw|KOR}}
The following is the South Korean roster in the women's field hockey tournament of the 2004 Summer Olympics.

Head coach: Kim Sang-ryul

Park Yong-sook (GK)
Kim Yun-mi
Lee Jin-hui
Yoo Hee-joo
[[Kim Jeong-a]]
[[Lee Seon-ok]]
[[Lee Mi-seong]]
[[Park Eun-kyung (field hockey)|Park Eun-kyung]]
<li value=10>[[Oh Ko-woon]]
[[Kim Seong-eun (field hockey)|Kim Seong-eun]]
[[Go Gwang-min]]
[[Park Mi-hyun]]
<li value=15>[[Kim Jin-gyeong]]
[[Lim Ju-young]] (GK)
[[Kim Mi-seon]]
[[Park Jeong-suk]]
{{div col end}}<section end=KOR />

References
{{reflist}}

External links
[http://www.fihockey.org/vsite/vnavsite/page/directory/0,10853,1181-151931-169147-nav-list,00.html FIH Archive]

{{Field hockey at the Summer Olympics}}

[[Category:Field hockey players at the 2004 Summer Olympics|*]]
[[Category:Field hockey at the 2004 Summer Olympics – Women's tournament|Squads]]
[[Category:Women's Olympic field hockey squads|2000]]